WEVC (107.1 FM) is a radio station licensed to Gorham, New Hampshire. The station is owned by New Hampshire Public Radio, and is an affiliate of their public radio network.

The station signed on in May 1995 as commercial station WXLQ. The station carried country music and classic rock formats during its five years of commercial operation. In 1999, founder Gladys Powell sold the station to NHPR, which made it part of its network on January 10, 2000. It is the only station to be acquired by NHPR (all other NHPR stations were built and signed on by the network).

References

External links
nhpr.org

EVC
Coös County, New Hampshire
Radio stations established in 1995
NPR member stations